The Bonnington Range is a subrange of the Selkirk Mountains of the Columbia Mountains in southeastern British Columbia, Canada, located between Salmo River and Columbia River south of Nelson.

References

Bonnington Range in the Canadian Mountain Encyclopedia

Selkirk Mountains